"Helluva Nite" is an English language song by the Norwegian urban duo Madcon featuring vocals from Maad*Moiselle. Even though Ludacris is featured on the album, Madcon decided not to put him in the single. It is the fourth single released from their fourth album Contraband. The song was written by Jonas Jeberg, Christopher Bridges, Marcus John Bryant, Nakisha Smith, Tshawe Baqwa and Yosef Wolde-Mariam. It was released on the 26 September 2011.
In Germany Itchy from Culcha Candela is featured for the single release.

Music video
A music video to accompany the release of "Helluva Nite" was first released onto YouTube on 7 September 2011 at a total length of three minutes and fifteenth seconds.

Track listing

Credits and personnel
Lead vocals – Madcon and Maad*Moiselle
Lyrics – Jonas Jeberg, Christopher Bridges, Marcus John Bryant, Nakisha Smith, Tshawe Baqwa, Yosef Wolde-Mariam
Label – Cosmos Music Norway

Chart performance

Release history

References

2011 singles
Songs written by Jonas Jeberg
2010 songs
Songs written by Ludacris